is a Japanese manga series written and illustrated by Umi Shiina. It has been serialized in Kodansha's Monthly Afternoon since December 2016. A live-action television series adaptation aired from March to May 2022 on WOWOW.

Plot 
Yūri Kariya is a female high-school student who starts a relationship with another student, Ryūhei Aono, from the next class. However, two weeks later, Aono dies in a car accident. When, distraught, Yūri attempts to commit suicide, Aono appears to her as a ghost, and tells her that he will be there for her, and not to die, and Yūri accepts. They continue their "relationship," with Yūri pretending to be talking on the phone around people so as to continue talking with him.

One day, Yūri suggests that Aono should try possession. Aono is confused, but then he possesses her body briefly. Since that moment, Aono develops a second, darker personality, "Black Aono", who tries to possess people around him, becoming increasingly powerful and attempting to take Yūri to the afterworld. 

Aono's best friend from before his death, Masayoshi Fujimoto, and reclusive and horror movie fanatic Mio Horie, deepen their friendship as they investigate the secret of Black Aono.

Characters

Yūri's boyfriend. He is a male student at Kazachi High School, class 2C. He died two weeks after starting a relationship with Yūri, and appears as a ghost from then on. He has a gentle and sincere personality. However, since he became a ghost, he has developed a darker alternate personality, called "Black Aono."

A female student at Kazachi High School, class 2D. She is a natural airhead and the owner of a single-minded personality. She was in a relationship with Aono before he died, and continues to be in a relationship with him even after he became a ghost. She is in a state of "sacrificial contract" with Aono, and her appearance has been changing due to the contract.

Aono's friend. He is a male student at Kazachi High School, class 2C. He is harsh in his words, but kind at heart. He is the only one other than Yūri who knows that Aono has become a ghost, but unlike her, he cannot see him.

A female student at Kazachi High School and classmate of Yūri's. She has a deep knowledge of horror films, and cooperates with Yuuri and Fujimoto to investigate Aono.

Media

Manga
I Want to Hold Aono-kun so Badly I Could Die is written and illustrated by Umi Shiina. The series began in Kodansha's Monthly Afternoon on December 24, 2016. In May 2021, it was announced that the manga entered its final arc. Kodansha has collected its chapters into individual tankōbon volumes. The first volume was released on June 23, 2017. As of January 23, 2023, ten volumes have been released.

In North America, Kodansha USA started the English digital release of the manga on October 24, 2017.

Volume list

Live-action series
In May 2021, a live-action television series adaptation produced by Wowow was announced. The series was directed by Sumisu, with scripts by Shinya Tamada, and stars Shori Sato. It aired from March 18 to May 20, 2022.

Reception
In 2018, I Want to Hold Aono-kun so Badly I Could Die ranked 14th on the 5th Next Manga Awards in the Print category. It was one of the Jury Recommended Works at the 21st Japan Media Arts Festival in 2018. In December 2019, Brutus magazine included the manga on their "Most Dangerous Manga" list, which included works with the most "stimulating" and thought-provoking themes. The manga was nominated for the 25th annual Tezuka Osamu Cultural Prize in 2021. The manga was nominated for the 45th Kodansha Manga Award in the general category in 2021.

References

External links
  
 I Want to Hold Aono-kun so Badly I Could Die official live-action series website (in Japanese)
 

2022 Japanese television series debuts
2022 Japanese television series endings
Ghost comics
Horror anime and manga
Kodansha manga
Manga adapted into television series
Romance anime and manga
Seinen manga
Wowow original programming